Miho Igarashi (born 17 January 1997) is a Japanese freestyle wrestler. She won the gold medal in the 50 kg event at the 2020 Asian Wrestling Championships in New Delhi, India.

She won the gold medal in the women's 48 kg event at the 2015 World Junior Wrestling Championships held in Salvador da Bahia, Brazil. She also won the gold medal in this event at the 2016 World Junior Wrestling Championships held in Mâcon, France. At the 2017 Asian Indoor and Martial Arts Games held in Ashgabat, Turkmenistan, she won the silver medal in the 48 kg event.

Achievements

References

External links 
 

Living people
1997 births
Place of birth missing (living people)
Japanese female sport wrestlers
Asian Wrestling Championships medalists
21st-century Japanese women